DZRL (639 AM) Radyo Ronda is a radio station owned and operated by the Radio Philippines Network. Its studios, offices, and transmitter are located at the RPN Bldg., National Highway, Brgy. Caunayan, Batac. It is the pioneer AM radio station in the province.

History
DZRL is the first radio station in Ilocos Norte established in 1959. It was first located at Bueno Bldg. in Laoag until 1971.

In 1972, when Martial Law was implemented, Kanlaon Broadcasting System took over the ownership of the station and relocated it Mangapit Bldg. in Batac, in front of Eureka High School, equipped with a brand new NEC transmitter. At that time, the said city was the fastest growing municipality in the province. The following year, DZRL transferred to its current home at Brgy. Caunayan, Batac, which is a stone's throw away from the Batac Campus of the Mariano Marcos State University.

DZRL is the only radio station in the province whose operation was not disrupted during Martial Law, making the station the most listened to radio station in the province at that time.

References

Radio Philippines Network
RPN News and Public Affairs
Radio stations in Ilocos Norte
News and talk radio stations in the Philippines
Radio stations established in 1959